Crimen injuria is a crime under South African common law, defined to be the act of "unlawfully, intentionally and seriously impairing the dignity of another." Although difficult to precisely define, the crime is used in the prosecution of certain instances of road rage, stalking, racially offensive language, emotional or psychological abuse and sexual offences against children.

Etymology
The phrase crimen injuria is Latin, short for crimen injuria datum, meaning "offence committed without lawful cause".

References

Crimes
South African criminal law